Christopher Fowler is an English writer.

Christopher Fowler may also refer to:

Christopher Fowler (Medal of Honor) (1850–?), United States Navy sailor
Christopher Fowler (minister) (1610–1678), English ejected minister
Chris Fowler (born 1962), American sports journalist
Chris Fowler (footballer) (born 1948), Australian footballer

See also
Christopher Brocklebank-Fowler (1934–2020), British politician